Public and private libraries in Bangladesh, both physical and electronic.

Government libraries

National libraries 
 National Archives & National Library of Bangladesh
 National Health Library & Documentation Center Dhaka Bangladesh

Cabinet libraries 
Prime Minister's Office Library, Dhaka
Ministry of Law, Justice, and Parliamentary Affairs Library
Ministry of Foreign Affairs Library
 Ministry of Labour and Employment Library
 Ministry of Education Library
 Ministry of Agriculture Library
 Ministry of Shipping Library
 Ministry of Health and Family Welfare Library
 Ministry of Primary and Mass Education Library
Economic Relations Documentation Centre, Ministry of Finance
Bangladesh Atomic Energy Commission Library

Institutional libraries
 Bangla Academy Library
 Bangladesh Bank Library
 Bangladesh Institute of Development Studies Library
 United Nations Information Centre, Dhaka

Public libraries
 Central Public Library (Dhaka) 
 Khulna Government Public Library
 Jessore Public Library
 Mymensingh Government Public Library
 Islamic Foundation Central Library
 Islamic Foundation Library, Mymensingh
 Manirampur Public Library, Manirampur, Jessore
 world of 71 (Public Library & Resource Centre), Manirampur, Jessore
 Madaripur Government Public Library.
 District Govt. Public Library, Natore See Also

Educational institutions

Public university libraries 

Dhaka University Central Library
 Rajshahi University Library 
BUET Central Library
KUET Central Library
 IBA Library
 MIST Central Library
 CUET Library
DUET Library
 E-Library, Faculty of Business Studies, University of Dhaka
 Islamic University, Bangladesh Central Library
 IUT Library and Documentation Center
 JahangirNagar University Library
 Chittagong University Library
 Bangabandhu Sheikh Mujib Medical University Library
 Khulna University Central Library
 RUET Central Library
 Shahjalal University of Science and Technology Library
 Jessore Science and Technology University Library
 Sher-e-Bangla Agricultural University Library

Private university libraries 
 Americal International University-Bangladesh Library
 BRAC University Ayesha Abed Library
 Eastern University Library
 East West University Library
 Green University of Bangladesh Library
 Independent University Library
 International Islamic University Chittagong
 North Bengal International University E-library
 Northern University Bangladesh Library
 North South University Library
 Stamford University, Bangladesh Library
 Southeast University Library
 State University of Bangladesh Library
 United International University Library
 University of Information Technology and Science
 University Of Liberal Arts Bangladesh
 Uttara University Library
 World University of Bangladesh Library
 Leading University Library
 German University Bangladesh Library

College libraries
 Shahid Khorshed Memorial Library (Mirzapur Cadet College)
 Ideal School and College Library
 Dhaka College Library
 Government Teachers' Training College Library
 Government Women College Library
 SK. Burhanuddin P.G. College Library
 Govt Titumir College library .

Non-government libraries
 Bir Chandra Ganapathagar, kandirpar, Comilla (Established in 1985)
Book Centre, Chandpur City (the largest library of Bangladesh)
 Friends Library, Kanungopara, Boalkhali, Chittagong (Since-1902)
 Surdhuni Library, Asad Road, Khalilgonj, Kurigram 5600 (Established in December, 2013;)
 Dania Pathagar, South Dania, Dhaka 1236 (Established in 1989)

Public libraries
 Projonmo - A Contemplative Library, Gazipur, Bangladesh 
Chandpur Public Library, Chandpur City
 Nayla Begum Memorial Public Library (Est. 2020))
 Bishwo shahitto kendro Library
 Gonokendor- BRAC  Library
 Maruf Sharmeen Smrity Sonstha Library, Zatramura, Rupganj, Narayanganj
 Muslim Institute Library, Mymensingh
 Shudhijon Pathagar, Narayanganj
 Shihipur Public Library, Bogra
 Srisri Pathodyan, 19/50 Rupnagor, Dhaka. Ashraful Alam Siddique. Mob 01711310483
 Killar Andar Islamic Library, Lohagara, Chittagong. Mobile phone- 01835 559712-3
 Woodburn Public Library
 Sylhet Mushtak Chy Public Library
 Durbar Songho Gronthagar, Khalishpur, Khulna
 Surdhuni Library, Asad Road, Khalilgonj, Kurigram 5600 (Government Registered Library, Reg. No. Kuri-48;)
 Bondhon Gronthagar, Mirpur-14,Dhaka-1206.
 MM Hafiz Memorial Public Library, Madaripur 7900.
 District Govt. Public Library, Natore.
 Scientist.Dr. M.A. Wazed Miah Memorial Library, Mohmmadpur Town Hall, Fall market-3rd floor, Dhaka-1207
 Sylhet Mushtak Chy Public Library, 
 Shahparan, Sylhet. (Est. 2020) Mobile No. 01761 351000
 Anirban Library (Est. 1990), Mahmudhati, Paikgacha, Khulna 
 Nazrul Public Library, Gopalgonj.

Medical libraries
 Apollo Hospital Dhaka Library
 Centre for Medical Education Library
 Library and Information Services Unit (LISU) of the ICDDR,B,Chandpur
 WHO Library of Bangladesh
 Bangladesh College of Physicians and Surgeons
 Bangladesh Health Professions Institute - Centre for the Rehabilitation of the Paralysed e-library

Other
 British Council Library, Bangladesh

References

 
Bangladesh education-related lists
Bangladesh
Libraries